The Chicago mayoral election of 2007 saw incumbent mayor Richard M. Daley win a landslide victory, garnering a 51-point margin of victory.

Daley was opposed by Cook County Circuit Court Clerk Dorothy Brown and William "Dock" Walls.

Candidates
Dorothy Brown, Cook County Clerk
Richard M. Daley, incumbent mayor
William "Dock" Walls III, former aide to Harold Washington

Nominations invalid
The following candidates had their nominations deemed invalid by the Chicago Board of Elections, and thus were denied inclusion on the ballot:
Thomas O'Brien
Ziff Anthony Sistrunk
Syron S. Smith, community activist

Declined
Luis Gutiérrez, congressman
Jesse Jackson Jr., congressman

Campaign
Despite speculation that they might challenge Daley, congressmen Luis Gutierrez and Jesse Jackson Jr. both opted not run. Both had explored potential runs, but declared that they had opted to remain in Washington, D.C. after the Democratic Party captured control of the United States House of Representatives in the November 2006 congressional elections.
 Gutierrez had been exploring a 2007 bid for mayor at least as early as December 2005, when he publicly confirmed his interest in possibly running. Some analysts speculated that the true reason that both men opted against running was that they had both concluded that they lacked viable prospects of unseating Daley.

In the previous election Daley faced opponents who lacked significant campaign experience. With Brown's entry into the 2007 election, Daley was faced with an opponent with significant electoral experience. In her 2004 reelection as clerk, Brown had received just under 800,000 votes in the city of Chicago.

While both Brown and Walls were African Americans, neither were able to coalesce strong support from black voters. They also failed to enthuse much support from other groups.

While the election was nonpartisan, all three candidates were members of the Democratic Party.

Brown ran an issue-focused campaign, releasing policy papers on housing, ethics, transportation, public safety, and economic development. Some argued that, in her campaign, Brown was too light on Daley, failing to hammer him with criticism. Brown's campaign failed to garner endorsements.
Walls criticized Daley's hiring practices.

Daley massively eclipsed his opponents in fundraising. Daley had nearly $6 million in funds, while Brown had less than $200,000 and Walls had less than $10,000.

Daley's fundraising advantage allowed him to run a three-week long barrage of television advertisements in advance of the election.

Daley made use of Democratic organizations in the city's wards to run his field operations.

As was the case in all of his reelection campaigns, Daley did not attend any debates.

Chicago Housing Authority head Terry Peterson resigned his position to serve as Daley's campaign manager.

Endorsements

Results
Daley won a plurality in each of Chicago's fifty wards, and obtained an absolute majority in forty-nine.

Daley even beat Brown by a broad margin in her home ward, the city's 8th ward.

Voter turnout increased slightly from the previous election, but was still the second-lowest turnout in a Chicago mayoral election. Only one-third of the city's 1.4 million registered voters participated in the election.

Results by ward

Aftermath
Daley delivered a brief election night victory speech at the Chicago Hilton & Towers.

By winning the election Daley had secured a sixth term as mayor (his fifth full four-year term, since he had first become mayor in a special election to a partial term following the death of Harold Washington). By winning his sixth mayoral election, Daley tied the record set by his father for the most Chicago mayoral election victories. During his subsequent term, Daley surpassed his father as the longest-tenured mayor in Chicago history. This term was ultimately Daley's last, as he opted to forgo seeking reelection in 2011.

In her concession speech Brown congratulated Daley but urged residents of Chicago, "to hold this mayor accountable". She also declared that voters had, "not seen the last of Dorothy Brown". Brown would explain her loss by declaring that she believed that voters had failed to, "understand the magnitude of the crime and corruption," which had occurred under Daley's tenure. Brown was subsequently reelected as Clerk in 2008, 2012, and 2016. She ran unsuccessfully for President of the Cook County Board of Commissioners in 2010. She ran for mayor again in the 2019 election, but failed to qualify for inclusion on the ballot.

Walls ran for mayor again in 2011, 2015 and 2019.

References

2007
Chicago
2007 Illinois elections
2000s in Chicago
2007 in Illinois
Richard M. Daley